1991 in Ghana details events of note that happened in Ghana in the year 1991.

Incumbents
 President: Jerry John Rawlings
 Chief Justice: Philip Edward Archer

Events

January

February

March
6th  - 34th independence anniversary held.

April

May
 - Provisional National Defence Council (PNDC) announces its acceptance of multi-party system in Ghana.

June

July
1st - Republic day celebrations held across the country.

August

September

October

November

December
Annual Farmers' Day celebrations held in all regions of the country.

Deaths

National holidays
 January 1: New Year's Day
 March 6: Independence Day
 May 1: Labor Day
 December 25: Christmas
 December 26: Boxing day

In addition, several other places observe local holidays, such as the foundation of their town. These are also "special days."

References